Bracebridge railway station is located in the community of Bracebridge in Ontario, Canada. The railway station was a stop for Northlander trains of Ontario Northland Railway until service was discontinued on September 28, 2012.

In 2021, The Government of Ontario announced plans to restore Ontario Northland Railway Service, including a stop in Bracebridge, between Toronto and either Timmins or Cochrane by the mid 2020s.

Ontario Northland Motor Coach Services maintains a stop at Riverside Inn in Bracebridge.

As of 2015, only the small waiting station and parking lot remains. A former CNR speeder maintenance car on static display by Muskoka Rails Museum has been removed and is now located in Gravenhurst.

References

Ontario Northland Railway stations
Rail transport in Bracebridge, Ontario
Railway stations in the District Municipality of Muskoka
Disused railway stations in Canada
Railway stations closed in 2012